The Hamburg Sign Language Notation System, or HamNoSys, is a transcription system for all sign languages (not only for American Sign Language), with a direct correspondence between symbols and gesture aspects, such as hand location, shape and movement. It was developed in 1985 at the University of Hamburg, Germany.  it is in its fourth revision.

Though it has roots in Stokoe notation, HamNoSys does not identify with any specific national diversified fingerspelling system, and as such is intended for a wider range of applications than Stokoe which was designed specifically for ASL and only later adapted to other sign languages.

Unlike SignWriting and the Stokoe system, it is not intended as a practical writing system. It's more like the International Phonetic Alphabet in that regard. Both systems are meant for use by linguistics, and include detail such as allophones that are not relevant to those actually using the language.

The HamNoSys is not encoded in Unicode. Computer processing is made possible by a  font, which uses Private Use Area characters.

References 

University of Hamburg
Sign language notation
Writing systems introduced in 1985